Poi Satchi is a 1982 Indian Tamil-language film, directed by M. A. Kaja, starring K. Bhagyaraj, Raadhika and Sumithra. It was released on 3 September 1982. The film failed at the box office.

Plot

Cast 
 K. Bhagyaraj
 Raadhika
 Sumithra
 Veerapan
 Senthil
 Peeli Sivam
 Pasi Narayanan
 kovai Sarala 
 Anuradha
Master Haja Sheriff

Soundtrack 
The music was composed by Shankar–Ganesh.

References

External links 
 

1980s Tamil-language films
Films directed by K. Bhagyaraj
Films scored by Shankar–Ganesh